This is a list of Michelin starred restaurants in Beijing. The 2020 edition was the first edition of the Michelin Guide to Beijing to be published.

List of restaurants

See also
 List of Michelin starred restaurants in Hong Kong and Macau
 List of Michelin starred restaurants in Shanghai
 List of Michelin starred restaurants in Taipei
 List of Michelin starred restaurants in Guangzhou

References

External links
 Beijing Michelin Restaurants - the Michelin Guide

Restaurants in Beijing
Food- and drink-related lists
Beijing-related lists